The 1998 AXA League was the thirtieth competing of English cricket's Sunday League.  The competition was won for the fourth time by Lancashire County Cricket Club.

This was the last season in which all the first-class counties competed in a single league. For the 1999 season, the counties would be divided into a First and Second Division of nine teams each. The top nine teams at the end of this season were placed in the First Division, and the bottom nine in the Second Division.

Standings

Batting averages

Bowling averages

See also
Sunday League

References

AXA
Pro40